Bianca Maria Poggianti is an Italian astronomer studying the evolution of galaxies and galaxy clusters. Originally from Pisa, she is a director of research for INAF, the Italian National Institute for Astrophysics, associated with the Astronomical Observatory of the University of Padua.

Research
Poggianti has been a member of the Morphs collaboration, a coordinated study of the shapes and evolution of galaxies in distant clusters. She is known for her research on the correlation between galaxy size and the timing of star formation, and on the effects of the intergalactic medium on the motion of galaxies within clusters. Most recently, she has studied the ram pressure that is believed to strip gasses from galaxies in large clusters, leading to the formation of jellyfish galaxies, the cessation of star formation in the stripped galaxies, and the initiation of active galactic nuclei at the centers of these galaxies.

Recognition
Poggianti is a winner of the Friedrich Wilhelm Bessel Research Award of the Alexander von Humboldt Foundation.

References

External links
GASP program, led by Poggianti

Interview with Bianca Poggianti, She Is An Astronomer, 2009

Year of birth missing (living people)
Living people
Italian astronomers
Italian women scientists
Women astronomers